Steve Kouplen (born February 5, 1951) is an American politician who served in the Oklahoma House of Representatives from the 24th district from 2008 to 2018.

Oklahoma House of Representatives 
On November 6, 2018, he was defeated by Republican Logan Phillips.

USDA's Farm Service Agency
On January 20, 2022, Kouplen was appointed the executive director of the USDA's Farm Service Agency in Oklahoma.

References

1951 births
Candidates in the 2020 United States elections
Living people
21st-century American politicians
People from Beggs, Oklahoma
Oklahoma State University alumni
Democratic Party members of the Oklahoma House of Representatives